Violet Bepete (born 13 July 1990) is a Zimbabwean footballer who plays as a midfielder. She has been a member of the Zimbabwe women's national team.

Club career
Bepete has played for Aces Youth Academy in Zimbabwe.

International career
Bepete capped for Zimbabwe at senior level during the 2014 African Women's Championship qualification.

References

1990 births
Living people
Zimbabwean women's footballers
Women's association football midfielders
Zimbabwe women's international footballers